Subonoba gelida is a species of minute sea snail, a marine gastropod mollusk or micromollusk in the family Rissoidae.

The maximum recorded shell length is 2.94 mm. Minimum recorded depth is 94 m. Maximum recorded depth is 494 m.

References

 Ponder, W. F. (1983) Rissoaform gastropods from the Antarctic and sub-Antarctic: the Eatoniellidae, Rissoidae, Barleeidae, Cingulopsidae, Orbitestellidae and Rissoellidae (Mollusca: Gastropoda) of Signy Island, South Orkney Islands, with a review of the Antarctic and sub-Antarctic (excluding southern South America and the New Zealand sub-Antarctic islands) species. British Antarctic Survey, Scientific Reports 108: 1-96

Rissoidae
Gastropods described in 1907